Hundred More Years is the second studio album by American singer and songwriter Francesca Battistelli. It was released on March 1, 2011, through Fervent Records, Curb Records, and Word Entertainment. It peaked at No. 16 on the US Billboard 200. A deluxe edition of the album was released on March 12, 2013.

Singles
"This Is the Stuff" was released as the lead single from the album on January 10, 2011. Explaining the background of the song, Battistelli said to Songfacts "I came up with like 20 different frustrating things, and we just picked our favorites. The idea of me losing my keys and my phone is very true to my life. I'm constantly having my husband call my phone because I can't find it, and then it happens to be in my purse or in my pocket - it's a very true line."

"Motion of Mercy" was released as the second single from the album on July 18, 2011.

"Angel By Your Side" was released as the third single from the album on March 30, 2012.

On February 8, 2013, "Strangely Dim" was released as the lead single from the deluxe edition and overall fourth and final single from the album.

Critical reception

Andrew Leahey of AllMusic said "Francesca Battistelli keeps things bright and breezy on Hundred More Years. Her main goal seems to be making music, not converting her listeners, and Hundred More Years puts forth some strong Christian ideals without condemning any listeners who might not share the same beliefs." Christianity Todays Ron Augustine stated "Hundred More Years is as poppy as her 2008 debut with a little bit of modern country flare. It's appropriate music for sunny days and chipper attitudes." Lins Honeyman of Cross Rhythms said that the album is full of "radio-friendly and highly marketable pop songs." and went on to say that "Hundred More Years embodies Francesca's signature sound fans have come to love while exploring topics of family, friendship and life’s joys and frustrations." Jesus Freak Hideout's Jen Rose claimed "A more focused sound and mature lyrics don't detract from the bubbly style of her debut, but instead offer her work a new dimension. Hundred More Years isn't going to churn up deep discussions or make big challenges, but she gives her own twist to a proven pop sound, staying fresh and current enough to keep up with her peers, yet accessible enough to satisfy Christian radio listeners." Sarah Fine of NewReleaseToday said "Hundred More Years is what many Christian music fans would call one of the 'must-have' albums of the year, and I absolutely agree. The theme of this album of spending our time on earth wisely and investing in treasures that last is very encouraging, and the changes in Francesca Battistelli’s life have clearly impacted her musicianship, leaning towards a more organic approach to her craft. But more than that, it reflects in her songwriting."

Track listing

Personnel 
 Francesca Battistelli – lead and backing vocals 
 Tim Lauer – keyboards, string arrangements 
 Aaron Shannon – additional programming 
 Mike Payne – guitars, ukulele (1)
 Tony Lucido – bass
 Dan Needham – drums
 Ben Phillips – drums
 Scott Williamson – drums
 Eric Darken – percussion
 Steve Hindalong – percussion
 Chris Dunn – trombone 
 Mike Haynes – trumpet
 David Angell – strings
 David Davidson – strings
 Kristin Wilkinson – strings 
 Dave Barnes – lead vocals (6)
 Josh Bailey – executive producer 
 Barry Weeks – vocal producer, vocal recording 
 Marc Lacuesta – engineer
 Aaron Shannon – engineer 
 Alex Eremin – assistant engineer
 Adam Hull – assistant engineer
 J.R. McNeely – mixing 
 Ben Phillips – editing 
 Dan Shike – mastering 
 Jamie Kiner – production coordinator 
 Jason Jenkins – A&R 
 Katherine Petillo – creative director 
 Alexis Ward – design 
 Kristen Barlowe – photography 
 Sheila Davis Curtis – hair stylist, makeup 
 Leanne Ford – wardrobe

Charts

Singles

References

2011 albums
Francesca Battistelli albums
Curb Records albums
Fervent Records albums